Adrian Simon Gill (born January 3, 2006) is an American professional soccer player currently playing as a midfielder for Barcelona.

Club career
Born in Denver, Colorado, Gill moved to Catalonia as a child due to his parent's work commitments. In 2017, shortly after moving to Spain, he joined Cornellà, before a move to Spanish giants Barcelona the following year.

Having progressed through Barcelona's La Masia academy, he signed his first professional contract with the club in March 2022.

International career
Gill has represented the United States at youth international level. He is also eligible to play for Spain, but declined an invitation by the Spanish FA to represent them in April 2022, expressing his desire to represent the United States at senior international level.

References

External links
 

2006 births
Living people
Soccer players from Denver
Soccer players from Colorado
American soccer players
United States men's youth international soccer players
Association football midfielders
UE Cornellà players
FC Barcelona players
American expatriate soccer players
American expatriate sportspeople in Spain
Expatriate footballers in Spain